Nyrstar is an international producer of critical minerals and metals essential for a low carbon future. It was founded in August 2007 and listed on the Euronext Brussels that October.

With a market leading position in zinc and lead, Nyrstar has mining, smelting and other operations located in Europe, the United States and Australia and employs approximately 4,000 people. Its headquarters are in Budel-Dorplein, the Netherlands.

The company’s operations are located close to key customers and major transport hubs to facilitate reliable and efficient delivery of raw materials and distribution of finished products. 

Nyrstar’s operating business is wholly owned by Trafigura, one of the world’s leading independent commodity trading and supply chain logistics companies. 

Nyrstar was created in 2007 by combining the zinc smelting and alloying operations of Zinifex (an Australian mining company, now merged with Oxiana to form Oz Minerals) and Umicore (a Belgian materials technology company). 

yrstar was acquired by Trafigura in 2019.

References

External links

Companies listed on Euronext Brussels
Companies of the Netherlands
Zinc mining companies
2007 establishments in the Netherlands